This list contains the top fifty channels with the most followers on the live streaming social platform Twitch. , the most-followed channel belongs to Ninja with over 18.5 million followers. The female streamer with the most followers on her channel is Pokimane with just over half of Ninja's followers at 9.3 million.

List 

The following table lists the 50 most-followed channels on Twitch , with each total rounded to the nearest hundred thousand followers, as well as the primary category or categories in which they stream.

A  indicates a channel is no longer active on the platform.

See also 
 List of most-followed Facebook pages
 List of most-followed Instagram accounts
 List of most-followed TikTok accounts
 List of most-followed Twitter accounts
 List of most-subscribed YouTube channels
 List of most-subscribed YouTube Music artists

References 

21st century-related lists
Lists of Internet-related superlatives
Twitch (service)
Twitch channels